Youxia was a type of ancient Chinese warrior folk hero celebrated in classical Chinese poetry and fictional literature. It literally means "wandering vigilante", but is commonly translated as "knight-errant" or less commonly as "cavalier", "adventurer", "soldier of fortune" or "underworld stalwart".

Background
Of the two characters of the term, yóu (遊) literally means to "wander", "travel" or "move around", and xiá (俠) means someone with power who helps others in need. The term refers to the way these solitary men travelled the land using physical force or political influence to right the wrongs done to the common people by the powers that be, often judged by their personal codes of chivalry. Youxia do not come from any particular social class. Various historical documents, wuxia novels and folktales describe them as being princes, government officials, poets, musicians, physicians, professional soldiers, merchants, monks and even humble farmers and butchers. Some were just as handy with a calligraphy brush as others were with swords and spears. The xia originated in and were associated with the Mohist ideology, which stressed the importance of equality and encouraged defending the weak against unjust wars. At the end of the Warring States Period, former shi knights who did not transition into scholar-officials became xia as Mohist defenders of the weak. The 16th and 17th century saw a great revival in the xia culture of using martial arts to right wrongs. Some of these were recruited to serve in the Ming resistance against the Qing.

According to Dr. James J. Y. Liu (1926–1986), a professor of Chinese and comparative literature at Stanford University, it was a person's temperament and need for freedom, not their social status, that caused them to roam the land and help those in need. Dr. Liu believes this is because a large majority of these figures came from northern China, which borders the territory of "northern nomadic tribes, whose way of life stressed freedom of movement and military virtues". Many knights seem to have come from Hebei and Henan provinces. A large majority of the characters from the Water Margin, which is considered one of China's best examples of knight-errant literature, come from these provinces.

In poetry
One good example of Youxia poetry is The Swordsman (劍客) by Jia Dao (Tang Dynasty):

For ten years I have been polishing this sword;
Its frosty edge has never been put to the test.
Now I am holding it and showing it to you, sir:
Is there anyone suffering from injustice?

According to Dr. Liu, Jia's poem "seems...to sum up the spirit of knight-errantry in four lines. At the same time, one can also take it as a reflection of the desire of all those who have prepared themselves for years to put their abilities to the test for some justice."

A metric translation of the original Chinese poem with one iamb per Chinese character reads as follows:

A decade long I honed a single sword,
Its steel-cold blade still yet to test its song.
Today I hold it out to you, my lord,
and ask: "Who seeks deliverance from a wrong?"

Analogous concepts
Bogatyr in Russia
Futuwwa in Middle East
Fianna in Ireland
Knight-errant in Europe
Ronin in Japan
Sae Sok O-Gye in Korea

See also
Gan Ning
Li Bai
Song Jiang
Tang Yin
Wuxia
Zhou Tong (archer)
The Seven Heroes and Five Gallants

References

External links
The Knight-errant in Chinese literature, a 12-page paper by James J.Y. Liu. (accessed 12-20-2008)

Chinese folklore
Chinese warriors
Chivalry
Stock characters
Tang dynasty poetry